The 1928 Regis Rangers football team was an American football team that represented Regis College as an independent during the 1928 college football season. The team compiled a 5–4 record and outscored opponents by a total of 212 to 80.

In May 1928, Red Strader was hired as the team's head coach. He had been an assistant coach at St. Mary's. Strader was assisted by John Illia. Stubbs, who played at the guard position, was the team captain.

Prior to the 1928 season, Regis was admitted as "an associate member" of the Rocky Mountain Conference with the understanding that conference teams were under no obligation to schedule games and that the conference would not be required to admit Regis as a full member.

Schedule

References

Regis
Regis Rangers football seasons
Regis Rangers football